The gluteus minimus, or glutæus minimus, the smallest of the three gluteal muscles, is situated immediately beneath the gluteus medius.

Structure 

It is fan-shaped, arising from the outer surface of the ilium, between the anterior and inferior gluteal lines, and behind, from the margin of the greater sciatic notch.

The fibers converge to the deep surface of a radiated aponeurosis, and this ends in a tendon which is inserted into an impression on the anterior border of the greater trochanter, and gives an expansion to the capsule of the hip joint. It is also a local stabilizer for the hip.

Relations 
A bursa is interposed between the tendon and the greater trochanter.

Between the gluteus medius and gluteus minimus are the deep branches of the superior gluteal vessels and the superior gluteal nerve.

The deep surface of the gluteus minimus is in relation with the reflected tendon of the rectus femoris and the capsule of the hip joint.

Variations 
The muscle may be divided into an anterior and a posterior part, or it may send slips to the piriformis, the superior gemellus or the outer part of the origin of the vastus lateralis.

Function 
The gluteus medius and gluteus minimus abduct the thigh, when the limb is extended, and are principally called into action in supporting the body on one limb, in conjunction with the tensor fasciæ latæ.

Their anterior fibers also flex the hip, and by drawing the greater trochanter forward, rotate the thigh inward, in which action they are also assisted by the Tensor fasciæ latæ.

It was explained that both gluteus minimus and medius have same function. Their primary function is abduction of femur, while internal rotation and flexion can occur depending on the position of the femur. Additionally, with the hip flexed, the gluteus minimus internally rotates the thigh.  With the hip extended, gluteus minimus externally rotates the thigh.

The attachment to the superior capsule of the hip may also serve to retract the capsule away from the joint during motion. This mechanism may prevent capsular impingement similar to the role of the articularis genus in the knee.

Clinical significance 
Paralysis of this muscle or gluteus medius, such as may be caused by the superior gluteal nerve palsy, can lead to difficulty abducting the leg. Patients will compensate for their difficulty walking by adopting a Trendelenburg gait.

References

Additional images

External links 

PTCentral

Hip abductors
Hip lateral rotators
Hip medial rotators
Muscles of the gluteus
Hip muscles
Muscles of the lower limb